Tha khin Gyi Hnint Ngapi Toh Sayar is a 2019 Burmese action film, directed by Steel (Dwe Myittar) starring Thet Mon Myint, Htun Ko Ko and Shwe Thamee. The film was premiered in Myanmar on October 31, 2019.

Cast
Thet Mon Myint as Joe Joe
Htun Ko Ko as Sheriff Sithu
Zin Wine as U Min Paing
Htoo Char as Htoo Char
Shwe Thamee

References

2019 films
2010s Burmese-language films
Burmese action films
Films shot in Myanmar
2019 action films